Novopoltavka - is a village in Ukraine. It is part of the Mykolaiv Oblast. Its local government is the Novopoltavska Village Council. It is located 20 km south of the district center Novyi Buh.

History 
Novopoltavka was established in 1840.

As of 1886, a colony of Jews from somewhere in the Kherson Oblast inhabited the village. There were 120 farms, two synagogues, schools and shops.

During the Great Patriotic War, 227 villagers fought the Nazi invaders, 78 of which were killed. 146 were decorated with government awards. In September 1941, The Nazis shot 837 people in the village.

Economy 
The village possesses 4524 hectares of agricultural land, including 3475 hectares of rich, unused land. Winter wheat, barley, maize, sunflowers and sugar beets are all products of the village. The village also specializes in fattening cattle.

External links
 The murder of the Jews of Novopoltavka during World War II, at Yad Vashem website.
Novo Poltavka, Yad Vashem

Khersonsky Uyezd
Former Jewish agricultural colonies of Kherson Governorate
Holocaust locations in Ukraine

Villages in Bashtanka Raion